is a railway station on the Taita Line in the city of Kani, Gifu Prefecture, Japan, operated by Central Japan Railway Company (JR Tōkai).

Lines

Station layout
Shimogiri Station has one ground-level side platform serving a single bi-directional track. The station is unattended.

Adjacent stations

|-
!colspan=5|JR Central

History
Shimogiri Station opened on December 26, 1952. The station was absorbed into the JR Tōkai network upon the privatization of the Japanese National Railways (JNR) on April 1, 1987.

Surrounding area
 ruins of Ima Castle

See also
 List of Railway Stations in Japan

External links

Railway stations in Gifu Prefecture
Taita Line
Railway stations in Japan opened in 1952
Stations of Central Japan Railway Company
Kani, Gifu